Albertus Johannes (Bart) Verbrugh (July 19, 1916 in The Hague – February 5, 2003 in Dordrecht) was a Dutch politician. He was an MP for the Reformed Political League (GPV) from 1971 to 1981.

1916 births
2003 deaths
Members of the House of Representatives (Netherlands)
Politicians from The Hague
Reformed Churches (Liberated) Christians from the Netherlands
Reformed Political League politicians